Linospora is a genus of fungi in the family Gnomoniaceae. The genus contains four species.

References

External links 

 Linospora at Index Fungorum

Gnomoniaceae
Sordariomycetes genera
Taxa named by Karl Wilhelm Gottlieb Leopold Fuckel